Pinewood Elementary School may refer to:

In Canada:
 Pinewood Elementary School (Cranbrook, British Columbia)
 Pinewood Elementary School (Delta, British Columbia)
 Pinewood Elementary School (Prince George), British Columbia
 Pinewood Elementary School (North Delta, British Columbia)
Pinewood Elementary School (Mascouche, Quebec) - Sir Wilfrid Laurier School Board

In the United States:
 Pinewood Elementary School (Jacksonville, Arkansas)
 Pinewood Elementary School (Mims, Florida)
 Pinewood Elementary School (Timonium, Maryland)
 Pinewood Elementary School (Mounds View, Minnesota)
 Pinewood Elementary School (Omaha, Nebraska)
 Pinewood Community School (Eagan, Minnesota)